Dutch: A Memoir of Ronald Reagan is a 1999 biography with fictional elements by Edmund Morris about Ronald Reagan, the 40th President of the United States. There is much controversy about the book, cited by the Amazon.com editorial staff as "one of the most unusual and critically scrutinized biographies ever written, because of the fictional characters in display." Debate exists as to whether Dutch should even be referred to as a biography at all. It was published by Random House and edited by executive editor Robert Loomis.

Background
After the unprecedented success of his Pulitzer Prize-winning The Rise of Theodore Roosevelt, Morris was given the green light by the Reagan Administration to write the first authorized biography of a sitting president, granting him behind-the-scenes access never before given to a writer at The White House. Apparently the privileges were of little use; Morris claimed to have learned little from his conversations with Reagan and White House staff or even from the President's own private diary.

Morris eventually decided to scrap writing a straight biography and turn his piece into a faux historical memoir about the President told from the viewpoint of a semi-fictional peer from the same town as Ronald Reagan: Edmund Morris himself. The person comes from the same town as and continually encounters and later keeps track of Reagan.  The first time the fictional narrator sees him is at a 1926 football game in Dixon, Illinois. He asks a friend who the fellow running down the field "with extraordinary grace" is, and he is informed that it is "Dutch" Reagan.

The biography has caused confusion in that it contains a few characters who never existed and scenes in which they interact with real people. Morris goes so far as to include misleading endnotes about such imaginary characters so that he can confuse his reading audience. Elsewhere, scenes are dramatized or completely made up.

Regarding Reagan, Morris claimed, "Nobody around him understood him. I, every person I interviewed, almost without exception, eventually would say, 'You know, I could never really figure him out.'"

References

External links
The Hollow Man – New York Times review of Dutch
Washington Monthly review by Jonathan Alter
BusinessWeek Online review by Douglas Harbrecht
Presentation by Morris on Dutch at the American Enterprise Institute, December 7, 1998
Presentation by Morris on Dutch at the Ronald Reagan Presidential Library, October 12, 1999
Booknotes interview with Morris on Dutch, December 5, 1999.

1999 books
American biographies
Books about Ronald Reagan
Random House books
Literature controversies